Inmortal may refer to:

 "Inmortal" (Aventura song)
 "Inmortal" (Erreway song)
 "Inmortal" (La Oreja de Van Gogh song)
 Inmortal, an album by Gloria Trevi
 Inmortal, an album by DJ Nelson and Alberto Stylee

See also
 Immortal (disambiguation)